Najm Hosain Syed (born 1935) is a Pakistani writer of Punjabi language. He has written poetry and plays in the Punjabi language as well as literary criticism on Punjabi literature in his Recurrent Patterns in Punjabi Poetry (1968).

Early life and career
Najm Hosain Syed was born in 1935 in Batala, Punjab, British India and later moved to Lahore, Pakistan after the independence of Pakistan in 1947. He received his master's degree in English from Forman Christian College, Lahore in 1958. For his career, he joined the Pakistan Civil Service and worked there until his retirement in 1995.
He was married to classical singer Samina Syed, who died in 2016.

Najm Hosain Syed has mentored many writers and has been a source of guidance for many others interested in Punjabi literature. He reportedly does not give interviews on television or radio. He chooses to publish his books with relatively less-known publishers.

Major works 
Najm Hosain Syed has written poetry, criticism and plays in Punjabi. He has published over 85 books. He is considered pioneer of the modern Punjabi literature.
His Major Works include: 
Deewa Mundri (2010), 
Gal Waar Di (2010)
 Khyal Dukkad (2011)
 Rang (2000)
 Khappay (1986) - Punjabi Adabi Markaz, Lahore 
 Kafian (1976)
Chandan Rukh Tay Vehda
Kkyal keh Khayal 
Takht Lahore 
Alfo Pairni Di Vaar
 Bar di Var (1969)

Download-able PDFs of his books are available on http://www.faridbhandar.org/. His music compositions, sung by his late wife Samina Hasan Syed and daughter Risham Syed, an eminent Visual artist are on https://m.soundcloud.com/saminahasansyed 

Many works of Syed are directed in the form of plays by Huma Safdar's theatre "Sangat" such as "Rajni" and Ik Raat Ravi Di.

References

External links
Articles by: Najm Hosain Syed on Academy of the Punjab in North America (APNA) website

Pakistani dramatists and playwrights
Living people
1936 births
Punjabi-language writers
Punjabi-language poets
Forman Christian College alumni
Pakistani civil servants
Punjabi people